Elaine Youngs (born February 14, 1970 in Orange, California) is an American former professional volleyball player who competed both indoors and on the beach.

Youngs attended UCLA, where as a freshman she started on a team that went undefeated through the regular season. They reached the semi-finals of the NCAA tournament, where they lost to Texas. The following year the Bruins reached the semi finals again, where they lost to a powerful squad from Nebraska. A knee injury caused her to miss the 1990 season. She was red-shirted, returning for the 1991 season to help the team to win the national title. The team reached the championship match again in 1992, losing to Stanford. Youngs led the Bruins to the Final Four in each of the four seasons that she played. She also earned All-American honors in each of those four years. Youngs also spent two seasons playing on the Bruins basketball team, averaging 5.7 points per game. She graduated in 1993 with a degree in history. 

Youngs was on the USA Volleyball indoor team and played in the  1996 Olympics where the women placed 7th.

Nicknamed "EY", Youngs beach career started in 1997, winning third place in her first pro beach volleyball tournament. In 1997 and then 1999–2000 Youngs partnered with Liz Masakayan who later became Youngs coach from 2004 through 2008. The duo missed going to the 2000 Sydney Olympics by 50 points. In 1998 Youngs partnered with Nancy Reno until Nancy retired from pro beach volleyball. In 2001 Youngs partnered with Barbra Fontana, and from 2002 to 2004 partnered with Holly McPeak, winning the Beach Volleyball bronze medal together in the 2004 Athens Olympics.  She teamed with Rachel Wacholder for the 2005 and much of the 2006 season.  In August 2006, Wacholder left Youngs and partnered with Jennifer Kessy Boss and Youngs replaced Wacholder with Nicole Branagh for the 2007 AVP season. On September 8, 2007 Youngs won the Goddess of the Beach tournament for the first time in Las Vegas, Nevada. Branagh and Youngs achieved 5th place in the 2008 Beijing Olympics and continued playing together in the 2009 season. In 2010, Nicole Branagh partnered with Misty May-Treanor, replacing Kerri Walsh. Youngs retired from professional volleyball at the end of the 2010 season.

In 2002 Youngs was chosen as the MVP of the Association of Volleyball Professionals. In 2004 she teamed with Holly McPeak to win the bronze medal at the Summer Olympics in Athens. In her career Youngs won 51 professional beach volleyball tournaments. On October 6, 2006 she was inducted into the UCLA Athletics Hall of Fame.

Youngs currently works as a realtor in Durango, Colorado. During the winter, she enjoys "everything outdoors," including snowboarding, snowshoeing, hiking, camping and cross-country skiing.

References

External links
 
 
 
 Yahoo! Sports profile

1970 births
Living people
American women's volleyball players
American women's beach volleyball players
Volleyball players at the 1996 Summer Olympics
Beach volleyball players at the 2004 Summer Olympics
Beach volleyball players at the 2008 Summer Olympics
Olympic beach volleyball players of the United States
Olympic medalists in beach volleyball
Medalists at the 2004 Summer Olympics
UCLA Bruins women's volleyball players
UCLA Bruins women's basketball players
Sportspeople from Orange, California
Competitors at the 1994 Goodwill Games
Goodwill Games medalists in volleyball
20th-century American women
21st-century American women